Athani is a panchayat town located about 13 km from Gobichettipalayam in Anthiyur taluk of Erode district  in the state of Tamil Nadu, India.

Demographics
 India census, Athani had a population of 8,453. Males constitute 51% of the population and females 49%. Athani has an average literacy rate of 53%, lower than the national average of 59.5%; with 59% of the males and 41% of females literate. 10% of the population is under 6 years of age.

Religion
The town has several temples where annual festivals are celebrated.

Schools
Government Elementary School,
Government High School(Now upgraded as higher secondary school),
Little Flower Matriculation School, and
Kongu Vidyalayam Matriculation School.

Economy
Athani is a laid back town and lies on the banks of the Bhavani river which meanders between Savandapur on one side and Athani on the other side. Due to its proximity to the river, People are mainly occupied with agriculture. Paddy, Sugarcane and turmeric are the regular cultivation crops. A lot of films have been shot here.

The town has at least three banks.

References

Cities and towns in Erode district